The effects of Hurricane Dean in Mexico were more severe than anywhere else in the storm's path. Hurricane Dean, the most intense storm of the 2007 Atlantic hurricane season, formed in the Atlantic Ocean west of Cape Verde on August 14, 2007. The Cape Verde-type hurricane sped through the Caribbean Sea, rapidly intensifying before making landfall on Mexico's Yucatán Peninsula. Accurate forecasts of the storm's location and intensity enabled thorough preparations; nevertheless when the massive storm made landfall on the Yucatán Peninsula as a catastrophic Category 5 hurricane on the Saffir-Simpson Hurricane Scale it damaged thousands of homes.

Weakening as it crossed the peninsula, Dean emerged into the Bay of Campeche and re-strengthened before making a second landfall in Veracruz. Although the second landfall did not bring winds as intense as the first, it brought more rainfall and caused devastating landslides in the states of Veracruz and Tabasco. Between the two landfalls, Dean caused MXN$2 billion (US$184 million; 2007 dollars) of damage and killed 13 people.

Preparations

First landfall
Forecasters and computer models at the Miami-based National Hurricane Center predicted that Hurricane Dean would impact the Yucatán Peninsula a full 6 days before the storm actually arrived. The hurricane's stable and well predicted path gave all of the countries in the region ample time to prepare for its arrival. On August 17, at the request of the Quintana Roo state government, which was expecting their state to suffer a direct hit, the Civil Protection Office of Mexico's federal Interior Ministry declared a state of emergency for the entire state. This included the towns and cities of Cancún, Playa del Carmen, and Chetumal as well as the islands of Cozumel, Isla Mujeres and Holbox.

On August 18 authorities began evacuating people from parts of Quintana Roo, moving 2,500 people from Holbox Island and a further 80,000 tourists from elsewhere in the state. Air-evacuations of tourists were stopped when Dean's outer rainbands closed almost a dozen Cancún and Cozumel airports on the evening of August 20. The Campeche airport closed shortly thereafter. The state government set up 530 storm shelters in schools and other public buildings, prepared to hold 73,000 people. With 20,000 food packages ready, the state of Yucatán, Quintana Roo's neighbor to the northwest, declared a green alert indicating a low but significant level of danger.

World Vision and other international aid agencies prepared blankets, sheets, personal hygiene items and medicines for quick transport to affected areas. The United States pre-positioned a three-person disaster
management team into the Yucatán before the storm's arrival with the intent of helping coordinate disaster management if necessary. The U.S. State Department urged its citizens in Quintana Roo, Yucatán, and Campeche to prepare for the storm and to evacuate if necessary. The department also relocated its non-essential personnel from those states to Mexico City. At 1500 UTC on August 19 a hurricane watch was issued on the Yucatán Peninsula from Chetumal to San Felipe and final preparations were rushed to completion.

Second landfall
On August 20, warnings for Dean's second landfall were issued. The coast from Progreso to Ciudad del Carmen was put under a hurricane warning and the coast from Cancún at the tip of the Yucatán Peninsula west to Progreso. At 0300 UCT, August 21, a tropical storm watch was issued for the coast from Chilitepec to Veracruz, and a hurricane watch was issued from Chilitepec to Tampico, Tamaulipas. As Dean began to cross the Yucatán Peninsula and maintained its structure better than forecasters had expected, these watches and warnings were expanded. At their peak, a hurricane warning covered the area from Campeche, Campeche, to Coatzacoalcos, Veracruz, and a tropical storm warning stretched from Tampico to La Cruz, Tamaulipas.

Residents in Veracruz stocked up on essential supplies, especially food and water, ahead of the storm's second landfall. At the request of the government of Veracruz, federal Secretary of the Interior Francisco Ramírez Acuña declared a state of emergency for 81 municipalities ahead of Hurricane Dean's expected landfall in the state. This gave local authorities access to the resources of the Revolving Fund of the National Natural Disaster Fund to take care of the nutrition, health, and shelter their populations should the storm's damage require it.

Although Dean was still a hurricane and was expected to re-strengthen slightly before making its second landfall, the fact that it had weakened caused some residents to let down their guard. As a result, residents of Veracruz and Campeche were much less prepared for the storm than those on the Yucatán Peninsula.

Impact

First landfall

The hurricane hit land near Majahual on the Quintana Roo coast of the Yucatán Peninsula at 0830 UTC on August 21. Communication with the Mayan communities near the landfall location was initially difficult, but the town of Majahual, which had a population of 200, was "almost flattened" by the storm. Storm surge and high winds severely damaged or destroyed hundreds of buildings and had the strength to crumple steel girders. About 15,000 families were left homeless, primarily in small villages around Quintana Roo. At the Costa Maya cruise port, waves tore away portions of the concrete docks and destroyed the boardwalk. The damage made the port unsuitable for cruise ships, effectively freezing the region's tourism industry until they could be repaired. The hurricane's winds damaged 2.3 million ha (5.7 million acres) of jungle, almost all of it in Quintana Roo, Yucatán, and Campeche.

Extensive damage to fields planted with bananas, avocados, cucumbers, squash, jalapeño peppers, and other crops were also reported on the Yucatán Peninsula.

President Felipe Calderón cut short a visit to Canada to return to Mexico and assess the damage. Hurricane Dean's Category 5 landfall–the first such landfall in the Atlantic basin in 15 years–took no lives. International organizations, including the United Nations, attributed this to the government's thorough preparations and forecasters' ample warning.

Second landfall
The next day, at 1630 UTC on August 22, Hurricane Dean made a second landfall, this time near the town of Tecolutla, Veracruz, as a Category 2 hurricane. Following the second landfall on the Veracruz coast, the town of Joloapan then saw the eye pass directly over it. In addition, two rivers in the mountains of the state of Hidalgo overflowed, and rain fell as far west as the Pacific coast. Veracruz Governor Fidel Herrera said there was "a tremendous amount of damage". Petroleum production was not severely damaged and quickly returned to normal, although its brief interruption was responsible for a 6% year-on-year decrease in third quarter.

Hurricane Dean, at its second landfall, dropped  of rainfall across the western states of Jalisco and Nayarit. This rainfall triggered a mudslide in Jalisco which fell on 10 houses and killed one of the occupants. Landslides in Puebla killed five people, and another was crushed when a wall in his house collapsed. One person in Veracruz was electrocuted after touching a power line while repairing his roof. In Michoacán, as the outer bands of the storm swept over the state, a man sheltering under a tree was struck by lightning. Two women died in Hidalgo when heavy rain collapsed their house's roof. Another man drowned while trying to cross a rain-swollen river in Tlacolula, Oaxaca. The heavy rains caused dozens of smaller landslides throughout the country, particularly in Veracruz and Tabasco, but most of them caused no fatalities. At least 50,000 houses were damaged to varying degrees throughout the country. Although Dean's rains caused flooding as far inland as Mexico City, where they closed a portion of Puebla-Mexico highway, the damage was concentrated in the states of Quintana Roo and Veracruz.

As with its first landfall, Hurricane Dean damaged crops throughout its impact area. Unlike in Belize and the Eastern Caribbean, the storm spared the sugarcane crop in Veracruz.

Between the hurricane's two landfalls, Dean affected an estimated 207,800 people in the states of Quintana Roo, Campeche, Veracruz, Hildalgo, Puebla and Tabasco. The storm damaged  of power lines and left more than 100,000 people without electricity. Landslides, storm tides, and widespread structural damage combined to compromise water sources throughout the country. The extent of the damage was never calculated at a federal level, but hundreds of villages lost access to fresh water in the days following the storm. Hurricane Dean killed 12 people in Mexico but none of the deaths occurred during its first and most powerful landfall on the Yucatán Peninsula. Between the two landfalls the storm caused a total of Mex$2 billion (US$184 million) of damages.

Aftermath

Post-storm analysis showed that, while less deadly, Dean's first and more powerful landfall caused significantly more infrastructural damage than its second. Where the landfall occurred at the town of Majahual specifically, and the state of Quintana Roo generally, communities took longer to recover than in the rest of the country. Quintana Roo Governor Félix González Canto reported that although the cleanup in the state capital of Chetumal was completed within three weeks, it took more than six months to fix all of the region's rural roads. Unable to handle the hurricane's aftermath, the state government appealed to federal authorities and secured Mex$755 million (US$74.8 million) of aid. Combined with the state's contribution of $270 million (US$26.7 million), a housing-repair fund of over $1,025 million (US$101.5 million) was established. In the three months immediately following the storm, over 37,000 houses were rebuilt or repaired using monies from this fund.

In the days following the hurricane, immediate access to clean water was a priority for international aid agencies working in Mexico. The National Commission of Water spent another $25 million (US$2.47 million) of federal funds repairing the damaged infrastructure for irrigation and drinking water.

Carnival Cruise Lines and Royal Caribbean Cruises, the world's two largest cuise operators, diverted their ships away from the damaged cruise port of Puerto Costa Maya. Their plans originally expected diversions until at least 2009, but the central government was quick to fund rebuilding of the destroyed concrete piers. By June 2008 they were rebuilt to accommodate even larger ships than before, and ships scheduled stops there for September 2008.

The federal government was initially lauded for its swift and thorough preparation to which most observers, including the United Nations, attributed Dean's low death toll. However, after the storm there were several accusations of political motivation in the distribution of aid. Members of President Felipe Calderón's Partido Accion Nacional (PAN) distributed bags of bread, funded by the nation's disaster relief coffers, carrying the party's logo. In Veracruz Governor Fidel Herrera was accused by both the PAN and his own Partido Revolucionario Institucional (PRI) of using state resources, including hurricane relief, to support the campaigns of PRI candidates.

See also

Hurricane Dean
List of Category 5 Atlantic hurricanes

References

Hurricane Dean
2007 in Mexico
Dean
Dean Mexico